The Institute of Air Quality Management (IAQM) was launched in November 2002 to provide a focal point for all air quality professionals 
The IAQM is the largest professional body for air quality experts in the UK as well as the authoritative voice for UK air quality.

External links
 IAQM website
 IES website

Scientific societies based in the United Kingdom
Environmental science
Air Quality
Air pollution in the United Kingdom